is the eighth studio album by Japanese singer-songwriter Miyuki Nakajima, released in March 1981.

The album features "Hitori Jouzu", a song released as a lead single in October 1980 and became her second top-ten hit on the Japanese Oricon (since her 1977 chart-topper "The Parting Song").

Month of Parturition topped the Japanese albums chart for two weeks, and marked the number-six on the country's year-end chart of 1981. Also in December 1981, the album received honor of winning the 23rd Japan Record Awards for "Album Best 10", a category acclaimed the ten most magnificent long-playing records.

Along with a follow-up Kansuigyo released in the following year, Month of Parturition has been one of her best-selling non-compilation albums to date, selling over 590,000 copies.

Track listing
All songs written and composed by Miyuki Nakajima.

Side one
"" – 3:19
"" – 5:42
"" – 5:13
"" – 4:12
"" – 4:55

Side two
"" – 4:18
"" – 6:56
"" – 4:06
"" – 6:48

Personnel
 Miyuki Nakajima – Vocals
 Masaki Matsubara – electric guitar
 Takashi Ozaki – electric guitar
 Ken Yashima – electric guitar
 Shigeru Suzuki – electric guitar
 Kazuo Shiina – electric guitar
 Chuei Yoshikawa – acoustic guitar
 Hiromi Yasuda – acoustic guitar
 Tsugutoshi Goto – bass guitar
 Michio Nagaoka – bass guitar
 Kenji Takamizu – bass guitar
 Ryoichi Akimoto – bass guitar
 Masataka Matsutoya – keyboards
 Haruo Togashi – keyboards
 Yasuharu Nakanishi – keyboards
 Maki Tashiro – keyboards
 Izumi Kobayashi – keyboards
 Nobu Saito – percussion
 Motoya Hamaguchi – percussion
 Yuki Sugawara – percussion
 Nobuo Yagi – harmonica
 Keiko Yamakawa – harp
Jake H Conception – saxophone
 Eiji Shimamura – drums
 Yuichi Tokashiki – drums
 Tatsuo Hayashi – drums
 Yutaka Uehara – drums

Production
Performer, composer, lyricist, producer: Miyuki Nakajima
Arranger: Katz Hoshi (Side one #1 / Side two #3), Hiromi Yasuda (Side one #2), Masataka Matsutoya (Side one No. 3 / Side two #2,4), Mitsuo Hagita (Side one #4,5 / Side two #1)
Recording director: Yoshio Okujima
Director: YūZō Watanabe
Mixing and mastering engineer: Katsuya Kuroda
Assistant engineer: Bill Takahashi
Photographer, art director: Jin Tamura
Designer: Hirofumi Arai
Management for the artist: Hiroshi Kojima, Kunio Kaneko
Executive producer: Genichi Kawakami
Special Thanks to Gil House People
Mixed and Mastered at the Hitokuchizaka SIudio, Tokyo, Japan

Awards

Chart positions

Album

Singles

References

Miyuki Nakajima albums
1981 albums
Pony Canyon albums